Telestory is an Australian television series which aired 1961–1962. Produced by Artransa Park and aired on ATN-7, it was a 15-minute series in which an actor would read from a book. The first season consisted of Leonard Teale reading The Sundowners, while the second season consisted of Gordon Glenwright reading from They're a Weird Mob. Very basic television, it aired towards the end of the day's schedule, at time slots such as 10:10PM on Monday and 11:35PM on Friday. Additional episodes were planned but do not seem to have been produced.

The version of The Sundowners utilised stills from the film to illustrate the story.

A similar series was produced in Melbourne during 1961 called Let Me Read to You.

References

External links
Telestory on IMDb

1961 Australian television series debuts
1962 Australian television series endings
Black-and-white Australian television shows
English-language television shows